The Dominican Republic competed in the 2008 Summer Olympics, held in Beijing, People's Republic of China from August 8 to August 24, 2008.

Medalists

Athletics

Men

Women

Boxing

The Dominican Republic qualified six boxers for the Olympic boxing tournament. Nunez was the only boxer to qualify at the World Championships. Payano became the second to qualify for the nation, doing so at the first American qualifying tournament. The remaining four boxers qualified at the second American continental qualifying tournament.

Judo

Sailing 

Men

M = Medal race; EL = Eliminated – did not advance into the medal race; CAN = Race cancelled;

Shooting 

Men

Swimming

Men

Table tennis 

Singles

Team

Taekwondo

Weightlifting

See also
Dominican Republic at the 2007 Pan American Games
Dominican Republic at the 2010 Central American and Caribbean Games

References

Nations at the 2008 Summer Olympics
2008
Summer Olympics